A list of films produced in France in 1931:

See also
1931 in France

Notes

External links
French films of 1931 on IMDb
French films of 1931 at Cinema-francais.fr

1931
Lists of 1931 films by country or language
Films